The 166th New York State Legislature, consisting of the New York State Senate and the New York State Assembly, met from January 8, 1947, to March 13, 1948, during the fifth and sixth years of Thomas E. Dewey's governorship, in Albany.

Background
Under the provisions of the New York Constitution of 1938, re-apportioned in 1943, 56 Senators and 150 assemblymen were elected in single-seat districts for two-year terms. The senatorial districts consisted either of one or more entire counties; or a contiguous area within a single county. The counties which were divided into more than one senatorial district were Kings (nine districts), New York (six), Bronx (five), Queens (four), Erie (three), Westchester (three), Monroe (two) and Nassau (two). The Assembly districts consisted either of a single entire county (except Hamilton Co.), or of contiguous area within one county.

At this time there were two major political parties: the Republican Party and the Democratic Party. The American Labor Party, the Liberal Party and the Communist Party also nominated tickets.

Elections
The New York state election, 1946, was held on November 5. Governor Thomas E. Dewey and Lieutenant Governor Joe R. Hanley were re-elected, both Republicans. The other five statewide elective offices up for election were carried by four Republicans, and the Democratic Chief Judge with Republican, American Labor and Liberal endorsement. The approximate party strength at this election, as expressed by the vote for Governor, was: Republicans 2,826,000; Democrats 1,532,000; American Labor 429,000; Liberals 177,000; and Communists 90,000.

All four women members of the previous legislature—State Senator Rhoda Fox Graves (Rep.), of Gouverneur; and Assemblywomen Mary A. Gillen (Dem.), of Brooklyn; Gladys E. Banks (Rep.), of the Bronx; and Genesta M. Strong (Rep.), of Plandome Heights—were re-elected. Janet Hill Gordon (Rep.), a lawyer of Norwich; Elizabeth Hanniford (Rep.), a statistician of the Bronx; Mildred F. Taylor (Rep.), a coal dealer of Lyons; and Maude E. Ten Eyck (Rep.), of Manhattan; were also elected to the Assembly.

The New York state election, 1947, was held on November 4. No statewide elective offices were up for election. Four vacancies in the State Senate, and four vacancies in the Assembly were filled.

Sessions
The Legislature met for the first regular session (the 170th) at the State Capitol in Albany on January 8, 1947; and adjourned on March 18.

Oswald D. Heck (Rep.) was re-elected Speaker.

Benjamin F. Feinberg (Rep.) was re-elected Temporary President of the State Senate.

The Legislature met for the second regular session (the 171st) at the State Capitol in Albany on January 7, 1948; and adjourned on March 13.

State Senate

Districts

Members
The asterisk (*) denotes members of the previous Legislature who continued in office as members of this Legislature. MacNeil Mitchell, Sidney A. Fine and George T. Manning changed from the Assembly to the Senate at the beginning of this Legislature. Assemblyman Ernest I. Hatfield was elected to fill a vacancy in the Senate.

Note: For brevity, the chairmanships omit the words "...the Committee on (the)..."

Employees
 Clerk: William S. King
 Sergeant-at-Arms: Harold W. Cole

State Assembly

Assemblymen

Note: For brevity, the chairmanships omit the words "...the Committee on (the)..."

Employees
 Clerk: Ansley B. Borkowski

Notes

Sources
 Know Your Legislators in The State Employee (January 1947, Vol. 16, No. 1, pg. 16f and 23)
 Members of the New York Senate (1940s) at Political Graveyard
 Members of the New York Assembly (1940s) at Political Graveyard

166
1947 in New York (state)
1948 in New York (state)
1947 U.S. legislative sessions
1948 U.S. legislative sessions